Porphyrellus formosus, also known as a dark velvet bolete is a species of bolete fungus in the family Boletaceae, first described as Tylopilus formosus by Greta Stevenson in 1962, and moved to Porphyrellus genus in 2014 by J. A. Cooper.

It is endemic to New Zealand, forming mycorrhiza with southern beeches and mānuka. It's distinguishing feature is all-black and velvety surface of cap and stalk. It initially has white pores that turn golden when aged.

References

External links 
 

Boletaceae
Fungi of New Zealand
Fungi described in 1962